Bachofner is a surname. Notable people with the surname include:

 Carol Bachofner (born 1947), Native American poet
 Cornelia Bachofner, Swiss slalom canoeist
 Wolf Bachofner (born 1961),  Austrian stage and film actor